The Sharks (known as the Cell C Sharks as they are their title sponsor) is a South African professional rugby union team based in Durban in KwaZulu Natal. They compete internationally in the United Rugby Championship and Heineken Champions Cup, having competed in the Super Rugby competition until 2020. They are centred on the  union, also based in Durban and drawing players from all of KwaZulu-Natal Province. The team plays its home matches at the Hollywoodbets Kings Park Stadium in Durban.

In 1993–1995 South Africa was represented in the Super 10 by their three top unions (top three teams from the previous years Currie Cup).  Natal (as they were called then) qualified in 1993 and 1994.  Natal were runners-up in 1994 after having lost to Queensland 21–10 in the final. In 1996 and 1997 South Africa was represented in the Super 12 by their four top unions rather than franchises, and Natal qualified and competed both years. They have never won the Super Rugby competition, but have reached the final four times, as Natal in 1996 and as the Sharks in 2001, 2007 and 2012.

The side sports many Springbok players, including Thomas du Toit, Makazole Mapimpi, Lukhanyo Am, Eben Etzebeth, Bongi Mbonambi and 2019 Rugby World Cup winning captain Siya Kolisi. They have also featured many international stars including France international Frédéric Michalak and former Australian International Ben Tapuai.

History

Natal competed in the inaugural Super 10 during the 1993 season. They were in Pool A along with Auckland, Western Samoa, Queensland and Otago. They finished second in the pool on 12 points, behind Auckland on 16. The next season they played in Pool B with New South Wales, Western Samoa, Auckland and Waikato, and finished at the top of the pool to face Pool A winners Queensland in the final in Durban. Natal lost the game 21 to 10. Natal did not play in the 1995 series.

The Sharks' Currie Cup team played in the first Super 12 season, in 1996. After 11 games the Sharks finished fourth in the final standings, enough to get them through to the finals. They defeated Queensland at Ballymore 43 to 25 to get into the first Super 12 championship game. They finished inaugural runners-up, losing to Auckland 45 to 21 in Auckland. The following season Natal finished fourth once again, but lost their semi-final against Auckland.

In 1998 the Coastal Sharks (as the team was now styled) won 7 of their 11 games, and finished in their best position yet, third place. They were however defeated by the Crusaders in the semi finals. The following season the Sharks missed the finals, finishing 7th. In 2000 the Sharks finished last in the final standings. However the next season they came second – at the time their best ever finish – and after defeating the Cats, went to Canberra for the final, which they lost against the Brumbies.

In 2002 the Sharks missed the finals after finishing 10th on the season table. The following season they came 11th. 2004 was a better season for the team, coming in at 7th after the regular season. However, in 2005 saw them slump to 12th.

In 2006, the Super 12 was expanded and became the Super 14. In the first Super 14 season the Sharks narrowly missed the finals, missing out on a 4th-place finish on points difference. In 2007 they were top of the table and became the first South African side to host a Super 12 or 14 final. The Sharks fought hard in the final but lost to the Bulls after a try by Bryan Habana.

In 2011 the Super Rugby competition was expanded again to feature an additional team from Australia changing the competition to the Super Rugby tournament. The 2012 season saw the Sharks struggle in the first few weeks, but a run of good form saw them lose only one of their last seven games to sneak into the playoffs in 6th position. They had to travel to Suncorp Stadium, Brisbane, Australia for the qualifier against The Reds, whom they beat 30–17 to reach the semi-finals. They then had to travel another 11 000 km back to Cape Town to face the Stormers, they were not given much of a chance after having crossed the Indian for the second time in as many weeks, but again they prevailed 26–19. Having beaten the Crusaders in the other semi-final, the Chiefs claimed home ground advantage for the final. After travelling over the Indian yet again (the third time in three weeks, 55 000 km travelled in total) to Hamilton, the Sharks met the Chiefs for the final, but the fairytale was not to be, and they were defeated 37-6 by the Chiefs, who claimed their first ever Super Rugby title.

The Sharks did manage to win the South African Conference and trophy once in 2014. However, after the then Director of Rugby Jake White left the club to take up a coaching role at Montpellier he left his assistant coach Brad McLeod-Henderson in charge of the Super Rugby side. After a disatserous 2015 season finishing 11th, McLeod-Henderson left the Sharks and was replaced by Gary Gold. Gold only lasting one year at the team, however the Sharks managed a four-year run of quarter final finishes between 2016 and 2019. The Sharks lead the 2020 season on 24 points having played 7 games with the Crusaders and Brumbies both on 23 points having played 6 games. The season was cut short due to the COVID-19 pandemic, and was never completed.

With the Covid pandemic limiting travel, regional Super Rugby tournaments were hosted, with the South African sides taking part in Super Rugby Unlocked. The tournament was heavily affected by the pandemic and several games were cancelled, nonetheless the Sharks managed a third-place finish. It was announced in 2021 that the South African franchises would leave Super Rugby, and that South Africa would be represented by the 4 top franchises in the newly renamed United Rugby Championship. Due to the pandemic still causing problems for international travel another temporary regional tournament was announced, called the Pro14 Rainbow Cup. The South African sides competed in the 'Rainbow Cup SA'. The Sharks finished second behind the Bulls who went on to lose against the European leg winners, Benetton Treviso. The Sharks played their first official URC game against Munster in Ireland on 25 September 2021.

In 2021 it was announced that an American consortium under the name 'MVM Holdings' in partnership with Roc Nation, an entertainment agency owned by rapper JayZ, would buy a 51% majority stake in the Sharks franchise. Roc Nation later aided in the purchase of the English side Saracens by a consortium of investors.

The Sharks brand

This brand was conceived, presented and initially executed by Terry Kukle of Tag International Media. The Sharks mascot Sharkie was launched in 1995. To achieve this a substantial budget was allocated to refine this vision that would include the match facilities, the pre-and post-match activities and the team. The local press at first were very hesitant to accept the new name and branding and fans were polarised by the radical proposed change that flew in the face of rugby tradition and convention. After much controversy in the media (which very rapidly brought the proposed brand to everyone's attention) and a very successful season supported by great products and promotions, the Sharks were embraced by all. The Sharks' marketing has been widely acknowledged in marketing and rugby circles as best practice and included as a successful case study in many marketing textbooks.

There was initially significant resistance from many quarters. This resistance was ascribed to the traditional attitudes of the rugby-loving stakeholders. However, the strategy was successful and the success of the marketing has been widely acknowledged. Crowd attendances, merchandising, suite holder and season ticket sales have all been very successful. The brand is now internationally recognised and the branding strategy is reaping dividends for all its stakeholders. As a result, since the mid-1990s the Sharks have become one of the most well-recognised and popular unions in the South African rugby landscape. The Sharks are well supported across South Africa, with sizable fan bases in all major cities including Johannesburg, Pretoria, Port Elizabeth and Cape Town. Most of their supporters however live in KwaZulu-Natal Province, particularly in and around Durban and Pietermaritzburg.

Stadium

Hollywoodbets Kings Park Stadium in Durban is the home ground of The Sharks. It is locally known as "The Shark Tank". It currently has a capacity of 54,000. The ground was originally built in 1968, but have been worked on numerous times. A major upgrade occurred for the 1995 Rugby World Cup.

Region

This lasted until 2005, when the Eastern Cape attempted to launch their own Super Rugby franchise, the Southern Spears. That meant that the Border Bulldogs and Mighty Elephants teams were aligned with the Spears (and later Southern Kings) franchise and the Sharks were effectively affiliated with one provincial union only, namely KwaZulu-Natal.

Current squad

The Sharks squad for the 2022–23 United Rugby Championship is.

Coaches

The Sharks were coached by Former Springbok coach Ian McIntosh between 1996 and 1999, with Hugh Reece-Edwards as his assistant. In 2000, Reece-Edwards took over as coach with Jake White and Allister Coetzee as assistants.

All three were replaced the following year however, as Rudolf Straeuli was appointed coach, with Kobus van der Merwe as his assistant. In 2002, Clinton Isaacs replaced Van der Merwe as Straeuli's assistant.

Kevin Putt was appointed as Straeuli's replacement when he was appointed Springbok coach, with Theo van Rensburg as assistant. Dick Muir replaced Putt in 2006 and pulled in John Plumtree as his assistant. Plumtree took over the head coaching position for the 2007 Currie Cup, whilst Muir took time off to add to his qualifications and learn from some of the most successful coaches in rugby history, such as Sir Clive Woodward. Muir took The Sharks to the 2007 Super 14 final at home and was later seconded as an assistant coach to Peter de Villiers with the national side.

John Plumtree took over as full-time coach in 2008 where he found immediate success, taking the Sharks to their first Currie Cup title since 1996 when they defeated the Blue Bulls in Durban. He repeated that feat in 2010 when his team beat Western Province in the Kings Park final. Following their Super Rugby Final's appearance in 2012, the Sharks produced a lacklustre season in 2013, finishing 8th on the combined log and 4th of 5 teams in the South African division. Plumtree's final season as Sharks coach was marred by a roster depleted of injuries and perceived tactical challenges.

Soon after the Sharks' appointment of former Springbok and Sharks captain John Smit as team CEO in mid 2013, news reports emerged that White had contacted former Springbok Brendan Venter to assume a short-term coaching role for the Sharks. Following days of media reports speculating on Plumtree's job security, the Sharks announced that Plumtree would not be brought back following the end of the Super Rugby Campaign. Venter was soon appointed as the Director of Rugby for the 2013 Currie Cup campaign, with coaches Brad McLeod-Henderson (forwards) and Sean Everitt (backs) assuming the day-to-day coaching responsibilities. Following the end of the Sharks' successful 2013 Currie Cup campaign, Venter stepped down as Director of Rugby. Former Springboks' coach Jake White, looking to return to coaching in South Africa, was soon hired to succeed Venter as the Sharks' Director of Rugby and Super Rugby coach, with McLeod-Henderson and Everitt remaining as his full-time assistant coaches.

At the end of 2014 White resigned as Super Rugby coach and Director of Rugby, and former Kobelco Steelers coach Gary Gold was hired as Head Coach and Super Rugby coach for the 2015 Super Rugby Season. McLeod-Henderson resigned after a poor Super Rugby Campaign and Gary Gold assumed the reigns as Currie Cup coach for 2015, Director of Rugby and the Super Rugby coach for 2016.

Towards the end of 2016 Gary Gold left the Sharks and assistant coach Robert du Preez became coach for the 2016 Currie Cup campaign, as well as the Super Rugby coach from 2017. Du Preez would lead the Sharks to the quarter finals of Super Rugby for three consecutive years, but did not manage to progress beyond that stage.

For the 2020 season, du Preez stepped down and Sean Everitt was appointed head coach, with David Williams (backline and attack) and Brent Janse van Rensburg (forwards) as his assistants.

On the 28th of November 2022 the Sharks played in a 0-35 home defeat to the Welsh side Cardiff. This marked the first time in franchise history the Sharks had failed to score a single point in a home game. Something the provincial Currie Cup side had also never done in the professional era. The last game in which the provincial side had failed to score a point at home was in 1972 against England. 
The following day it was announced that then head coach Sean Everitt would be stepping down with immediate effect, and director of rugby Neil Powell would take over all of the responsibilities.

Captains

  Gary Teichmann (1996–99)
  Wayne Fyvie (2000)
 Mark Andrews (2001–02)
 Shaun Sowerby (2003)
 John Smit (2004–11)
 Johann Muller (2008–10)
 Stefan Terblanche (2010–11)
 Keegan Daniel (2011–13)
 Bismarck du Plessis (2014–15)
 Marco Wentzel (2015)
 Patrick Lambie (2016)
 Tendai Mtawarira (2016)
 Tera Mtembu (2017)
 Philip van der Walt (2017)
 Ruan Botha (2018)
 Louis Schreuder (2019)
 Tera Mtembu  (2019)
 Jeremy Ward (2019)
 Lukhanyo Am (2020-)
 Phepsi Buthelezi (2021-)
 Siya Kolisi (2022–23)
 Thomas du Toit (2022)
 James Venter (2022)
 Reniel Hugo (2023)

Individual records

 Most matches in a career: 159 (Tendai Mtawarira)  
 Most points in a match: 50 (Gavin Lawless, v Highlanders, 1997)
 Most points in a season: 193 (Patrick Lambie, 2011)
 Most points in a career: 746 (Patrick Lambie)
 Most tries in a match: 4 (Gavin Lawless, v Highlanders, 1997)(Stefan Terblanche, v Chiefs, 1998)
 Most tries in a season: 13 (James Small, 1996)
 Most tries in a career: 37 (JP Pietersen)(Lwazi Mvovo) 
 Most conversions in a match: 9 (Gavin Lawless, v Highlanders, 1997)
 Most conversions in a season: 37 (Curwin Bosch, 2021/2022)
 Most conversions in a career: 133 (Curwin Bosch)
 Most penalty goals in a match: 7 (Gavin Lawless, v NSW Waratahs, 1997)(Patrick Lambie, v Crusaders, 2013)(Robert du Preez, v Blues, 2018)
 Most penalty goals in a season: 43 (Patrick Lambie, 2013)(François Steyn, 2014)
 Most penalty goals in a career: 166 (Patrick Lambie)
 Most drop goals in a match: 3 (Boeta Chamberlain vs Ospreys, 2021)
 Most drop goals in a season: 4 (François Steyn, 2007)(Boeta Chamberlain, 2021/2022)
 Most drop goals in a career: 8 (François Steyn)

Honours
 United Rugby Championship
 Quarter-finalists (1): 2021/22
 Super Rugby
 Runners-up (4): 1996, 2001, 2007, 2012
 Semi-finalists (4): 1997, 1998, 2008, 2014
 Quarter-finalists (4): 2016, 2017, 2018, 2019
 Qualifying-finalists (1): 2011
 Conference Winners (1): 2014

Minor Honours
 Toyota Challenge
 Runners-up (1): 2021

 World Club 10s
 Third Place (2): 2016, 2018

References

Bibliography

External links
 

 
Super Rugby teams
South African rugby union teams
Sport in Durban
Sport in KwaZulu-Natal
1995 establishments in South Africa